Ebenezer Methodist Church is an historical Methodist church based in Freetown, Sierra Leone which was founded by the original African American founders of the Colony of Sierra Leone. Ebenezer Primary School was located in the basement of the church. Ebenezer was founded by wealthy Nova Scotian settler merchants who had broken away from the Rawdon Street Methodist Church following a dispute.

Sources

Churches in Freetown
Nova Scotian Settler (Sierra Leone)
Methodist churches in Sierra Leone